"Warrior" is a song by Australian DJ and recording artist Havana Brown. It is the second single from her debut studio album Flashing Lights (2013). The song peaked at number 11 on the ARIA Singles Chart and at number 3 on the Australia Dance chart. "Warrior" was certified double platinum by the Australian Recording Industry Association for sales of 140,000 copies. It also was a hit in the United States, peaking at number one on the US dance charts.

Background and composition
"Warrior" was written by Jonas Saeed, Niclas Kings, Luciana Caporaso, Nick Clow and Sabi, Jonas Saeed & Niclas Kings also serving as the producer of the song. Discussing the theme of the song with Andrea Simpson from Celebuzz, Brown described "Warrior" as, "about fighting for what you want even if the odds are against you... Pushing forward when others who fear you are trying to bring you down". "Warrior" was released digitally via the iTunes Store on 27 September 2013, as the second single from Flashing Lights. The track was serviced to radio on 14 October 2013. Lyrically, Brown is asserting her toughness and dominance, stating "I am a fighter, it's in my DNA/step by step, and brick by brick, nobody stopping me...Strike like a tiger/I stand like a soldier, yeah/march like a champion!"

Chart performance
"Warrior" debuted on the Australian ARIA Singles Chart at number 32 on 12 October 2013. After spending eleven weeks on the charts, the track peaked at number 11, staying there for one week. "Warrior" also appeared on the ARIA Dance Singles Chart, peaking at number three in the top twenty. The recording was certified double platinum by the Australian Record Industry Association (ARIA), denoting 140,000 units shipped in Australia. The song later peaked at number 1 on the US Hot Dance Club Songs chart (Billboard), becoming her fourth number one on that chart.

Promotion

Music video

The music video for "Warrior" was uploaded to YouTube on November 5, 2013. It features Brown and her backup dancers dancing in various warlike soldier costumes, including one seen in which Brown is wearing what resembles Ancient Greek battlements. The video also flashes back and forth between Brown and her dancers and a close-up shot of a beating drum, accompanied by the lines "Gonna feel my blood running wild and young; Gonna dance, dance, dance to the beat of my drum/Like a warrior."

Live performances
In 2013, Brown performed "Warrior" on The X Factor Australia and Dancing with the Stars Australia to support sales on the iTunes charts. Brown also performed the song when she embarked on her Oz Tour in October 2013 which included 12 shows in Australia, Canada and the United States. The tour concluded in Brisbane on 1 January 2014.

Formats and track listings

Charts

Weekly charts

Year-end charts

Certifications

Release history

See also
 List of number-one dance singles of 2014 (U.S.)

References

2013 singles
Havana Brown (musician) songs
2013 songs
Songs written by Niclas Kings
Songs written by Luciana Caporaso
Island Records singles
Songs written by Nick Clow
2015 AFC Asian Cup
AFC Asian Cup official songs and anthems
Songs written by Jonas Saeed